Angelo Rules  is an animated series produced by France 3, Teletoon, Super RTL, TeamTO and Cake Entertainment and directed by Chloé Miller and Franz Kirchner. It is based on the book series Comment Faire Enrager... by Sylvie De Mathuisieulx and Sebastien Diologent. On 29 November 2021, the series was renewed for a fifth season with 47 episodes which premiered in August 2022.

Plot
Angelo is the kid who tries to be the wise guy.  He is constantly coming up with plans and strategies to get out of trouble. He's determined as well that nothing will stand in the way of getting what he wants and he actually embraces challenges.

Angelo isn't put off by the natural setbacks most kids have to confront like parents, siblings and rules but that doesn't deter him. He has a couple of really good friends who also help him in his strategic planning, like Sherwood, the king of logistics and Lola, the enthusiast. Together, they make a winning trio.

Characters

Main characters

Angelo (voiced by Jennifer Visalli in Season 1 and Julie Alexandria in Season 2) - The protagonist of the series; a master in the art of strategy, who knows not of break the rules (except sometimes in season 2), but to unearth the flaws thanks to his intelligence and his sense of observation. We learn that his expertise comes to him from his childhood referring to the pilot episode. From that step, he would have "understood" everything about the world around him - well, almost. Like some of his conclusions that are a little hasty - even that Angelo's plans don't always go to plan - he is still a confident and optimistic character, calling himself a "super vigilante". Almost no situation throws him off balance. If he does not find the ideal solution, he does not hesitate to rush to intuition or to exploit possible alternatives. He decides to take on the challenges and gladly accepts the enthusiastic help of his two best friends, Lola and Sherwood. He and his two friends are fans of the rock band Slobber. He is also in love with Cindy, Lola's unseen cousin.
Lola (voiced by Cassandra Lee Morris) - Angelo's best friend. She is twelve years old and has been Angelo's neighbor since kindergarten. They know each other so well that one sometimes finishes the other's sentences. She was initially an only child, but from season 4 we learn that she has an older sister, and is very independent. When Angelo has a plan, she's the one who works out the details. Without her, some of Angelo's brilliant ideas would come to an end. She is kind and harmless and doesn't like to upset anyone. She is very enthusiastic and funny and because of this, she really likes to make others laugh by telling them jokes of her own or pulling pranks on them. Angelo trusts her because she is an intelligent, resourceful go-getter and has a cousin called Cindy (whom Angelo has a crush on). Although she is often with the boys, Lola also has a group of girlfriends and buddies with whom she chats and exchanges text messages on her mobile phone (until the fourth season in which the whole group has a phone). Lola had an old-fashioned cell phone before she got a smartphone in the fourth season, which she often puts to use in Angelo's plans. She also never lets Angelo and Sherwood stay at her girls-only slumber parties (even if most of the time, they are the ones who help organize these parties). Angelo also does not invite her to his evenings with friends, except for at the end of the episode "Girl Pajama Party". It is revealed in the episode "The Pigeons" that she has been terrified of pigeons ever since they ruined her first birthday party by eating the cake. She is such a fan of Slobber that she manages to memorize their biography by heart.
Sherwood Forrest (voiced by Aaron Conley) - Angelo's other best friend. He is eleven years old and he has been Angelo's best friend since they were two years old. They are in the same class. Sherwood is more reserved and a little "geeky" on the edges, but he is an extraordinary and faithful friend. Angelo's best friend, he played with him and they shared a lot together. They were talking some funny gibberish at the time (which would be a language Sherwood learned). He is not always convinced of the necessity of the challenges that Angelo wants to take up, but he is still easily convinced by the latter, and with Lola, it is the ideal trio. His many talents are so many valuable assets: very gifted in everything related to electronics and computers. He is the smartest kid in the school and is also extremely far-sighted. Sherwood's unseen parents are very protective of him, especially his mother who wants him to discover new horizons. Angelo offers him his finest minutes of freedom and adrenaline, but also his greatest fears. Despite being a bit of a nerd, Sherwood understands absolutely nothing about girls, but that doesn't stop him from having a little crush on Elena, Angelo's older sister.

Recurring characters

Angelo's Family

David "Dave" (voiced by John Douglas) - The father of Angelo, Peter and Elena, who is often immature and incapable of making important decisions. He is also impulsive and sometimes serves as a pawn in his son's pranks. In addition to Mom's well-known ingenuity, this anecdote proves the very origin of Angelo's intelligence. There is a very strong bond between Angelo and his father, even when Angelo gets into trouble. Mom's natural authority over her children sometimes spills over to Dave, almost making him feel like the first child in the family; despite everything, Dave and his wife form a united couple. He is a basketball fan and a big supporter of the "Red Dragons". He is also a fanatic of rhythmic gymnastics. In his childhood, he dreamed of becoming a rocker; this wish later came true thanks to Angelo. He thinks his job is so boring that at each work presentation at Angelo's school, he either finds a way not to explain his real profession, or makes up a job he has never done (like in the episode "Fake Stuntman"). Angelo mentions his first name as being Dave in the episode "Electra". In the episode "Bring it Back", we learn that Angelo's father was a former gymnastics coach back in 1982.
Anna (voiced by Gail Thomas) - The mother of Angelo, Peter and Elena and the most responsible in the family. She works in an art gallery where she is in charge of selling the paintings, which requires a lot of time and concentration. In the somewhat chaotic household, she strives to keep the peace between the children, and apparently does quite well in keeping watch over her world. She may be taken aback by Angelo's logic, but she knows him inside out and isn't easily fooled. She would obviously like her son to be a little less mischievous, but, secretly, Anna is quite proud of Angelo's ingenuity. A fan of experimental music - the only pleasure that Angelo took from her - she also likes to relax from yoga. As a child, she dreamed of becoming a professional hockey player.
Elena (voiced by Katie DiCicco) - Irresponsible, ambitious and lazy, Angelo and Peter's moody teenage sister Elena is already trying to figure out what to do with her life since she finished school and to appreciate the effect she has on her boyfriend, Hunter. Since Angelo knows how to get what he wants, Elena takes malicious pleasure in pointing out that he is far too young to do this or that, and in reminding her parents that she had no right to do this at her age. It's her very personal way of throwing obstacles in Angelo's way. Since the second season, Elena has shorter hair and changed pants. It's also noticeable in this season that she is more susceptible than she was previously. Since the third season, Elena is shown to have mellowed somewhat and become less aggressive towards Angelo. She is also fairly resourceful; it is possible that Angelo inherits his resourcefulness from her.
Peter (voiced by Jackson Rheingold) - Angelo and Elena's little brother. He always wears a yellow cap which he only takes off when he sleeps. At home, he literally jumps like a chimpanzee, pretending to be a caveman, a superhero or a Viking, and watches cartoons, such as The Wiznimals or Cuddle Farm. But when it comes to household chores, he's a real lazy guy: tidying up his room, changing the cat's litter, etc. He then plays the "baby" card to get what he wants, much to Angelo's chagrin. He wants everything his older brother has, even though he's four years younger, and resents if he doesn't get the same as Angelo. Sometimes, Peter and Angelo can join forces to face a common "enemy", but he can also be a formidable adversary. Behind a somewhat naïve appearance of "little brother" hides an intelligent little boy", as shown in the episode "Who Killed Mr. Rabbit?". This is not really surprising since he takes his older brother as a model. Peter really likes Lola's company. When he takes a lot of sweets, it may have adverse effects on him and he may be addicted to them. A special episode entitled "Peter's Day" is exclusively dedicated to him.
Grandma - Angelo's maternal grandmother. She is affectionate and sympathetic and loves cakes and cookies. In one episode Angelo makes her believe that he loves the recipe for Brussels sprouts but he discovers that she herself has never liked it and together they change this old Tuesday tradition into a gratin of pepper pasta (Angelo eats the peppers in the episode).

Angelo's School

Tracy Flickinger - Angelo's primary adversary from season 2. Since she is Mr. Foot's niece, she is in charge of discipline in the school. She loves challenges, and is narcissistic and very mischievous. She sometimes likes to call Angelo "loser" or "Angelooser" and can detect his slightest plans quite easily. As she was made responsible for her class and the school, she does not shy away from issuing warnings to anyone who does anything simple. In the special episode "Dark Angelo", she gets help from Angelo, who almost kisses her on top of a building, before she realises it was a dream. From this episode onward, Tracy realizes she has true feelings for Angelo. Tracy enjoys classical music and is good at dancing but doesn't like Slobber and calls them "too loud" (though she does ends up liking the band a little bit anyway). She even begins to help Angelo from time to time (especially when she too is in trouble), and in the episode "The Balance of Nature", Angelo becomes friends with Tracy and tries to integrate her into his friend group but ends up throwing off the balance of nature.
Walter Manetti (voiced by Danny McDermott) - The strongest and the "brutest" of Angelo's school. Surly, self-centered, thoughtless and sleepy in class, his fists are faster than his brain and he retains the character of a pig. He thinks he is a great intellectual even though his IQ rate is close to zero. He is still able to play the violin, despite his dunce habits. His catchphrase is "Manetti leaves". He fell in love with Elena in the episode "Manetti in Love" and Lola in "Manetti Must Win". According to the orientation tests, later he should be a bodyguard. He can't resist the smell of cakes and fruit. If he calls himself Manetti all the time, it's because he finds his first name Walter too corny. We discover that as a child, he was as soft as Butterfingers and that he was the object of humiliation. Since he had had enough of the teasing, he became hard on everyone. This is also why he admires Butterfingers, because the latter resists mockery. Manetti likes to refer to himself in the third person.
Butterfingers - A student in Angelo's class, he is Hunter's little brother and his parents run Adventure Parkland. Butterfingers is certainly soft and he does not hold the soul of an ordinary sportsman. In one episode, he manages to score a basketball basket without wanting to and without even looking followed by the applause of his comrades. He has great talent, and is an excellent dancer, but only on a given music. He is one of the scapegoats of Manetti and Tracy who love to scare him and for whom Manetti feels a certain admiration. He also has a crush on Monica, and has a cylinder head of revolution. In the season 2 episode "Door to Door to Door", Butterfingers and Manetti start to get along better thanks to the balance of rolls for Slobber's concert. However, Manetti later betrays him because of the money and even decides to go to the concert without him.
Owen J. Foot (voiced by Bill Morgan) - Angelo's homeroom teacher. Suspicious, killjoy and naturally distrustful of children who make him see all the colors, he is a rather strict teacher in class, but he also turns out to be a wacky character. He also has a soft spot for Miss Perla and has an incongruous talent for table tennis. When he was young, he was less rigorous and very soft. In season 2 it is revealed that he has a dog called Wellington, which is the password on his computer.
Vladimir Zonka - The physical education teacher at Angelo's school. Extremely loud and sporty (he claims to burn 2,000 calories a day and he walks ten kilometers to get to school), he likes to tell his life to anyone who wants to hear it. According to Angelo, when a teacher is absent, he is always the replacement. In the offside episode Zonka, it is discovered that in reality he does not predispose any talent for football.
Monica - A student in Angelo's class. She works as an editor at the school newspaper. She has red hair with moles on her face and is Danny' girlfriend. As a journalist from her school and having good interviewing, writing and publishing techniques, she has a press card. She also has some fame with her peers and many adults because of her cool attitude and partying. In one episode, she kissed Sherwood.
Candy - Monica's best friend. She too has a cell phone like Lola; she has blonde hair and was portrayed as whiny and sensitive in season 1, also very scared in some sticky situations and a bit pernicious in season 2, although later on she doesn't pay attention to canards more often than he does tells his entourage. She appears in several of the episodes although she has no particular role but we learn that she was Butterfingers' childhood friend.
Alonzo - A student from a higher class than Angelo. He plays basketball and volleyball, also good at sports, and a little naive, he has red (or brown) hair and wears a yellow tank top with an "8" marked on it. He is, of course, one of Zonka's favorite students. He is very close to Clyde and Brandy. All three look like Angelo and his two friends, but in aged form.
Clyde - A student in Alonzo's class, who is his best friend. He is like him: good at sports, very relaxed and likes to play basketball. He has darker skin, wears a blue (sometimes green) t-shirt with gray pants, and sports an arm band on his forehead.
Brandy - A student in Alonzo and Clyde's class, and a very close friend of Hunter, whom she has a crush on. She is athletic and good at football. She is also obsessed with Slobber.
Miss Perla - Angelo's art teacher. Sweet, calm and kind, she also leads yoga and relaxation workshops.
Ethan - One of Angelo's friends, who is as smart as Sherwood. He is addicted to video games and everything that has to do with technology.
Schmitty - The school chef. He is responsible for the multipurpose hall of the city, and is sometimes filthy and irresponsible. He has no respect for Geezer and calls him various different names. At Angelo's age he was in Elena's class.

Other characters

Cooper Manetti - Walter Manetti's younger brother. He is Peter's best friend and often goes to his house for a snack or to play. He looks a lot like his brother and is very naive for his age.
Hunter - Butterfingers' older brother and Elena's boyfriend. He is very strong and plays on Coach Zonka's football team, and was the ex-captain before Sherwood. What bothers Angelo about Hunter is that he is a show-off, and the fact that he makes fun of everyone. His position at Adventure Parkland is assistant chef.
Geezer - Angelo's grumpy old neighbour. He enjoys gardening, and sometimes talks to his wall while eating cat food. For his age he is extremely competitive, often managing to challenge Angelo to beat him. Angelo often agrees to help Geezer in exchange for a favor.
Ollie Van Dunk - A local skateboarder whom Angelo and friends idolize. When Angelo, Sherwood and Lola interview him, he reveals to them that he had several injuries before doing his extreme tricks. Angelo and the gang often try to copy him by doing his signature techniques such as the "yoyo", "kickflip" and then some, without getting a single scratch and in a single day. In the special episode "Brainscramble" it is revealed that he has a fear of heights.
Slobber - A punk rock duo consisting of brothers Alex and Eddy, who speak with British accents. They appear to be very popular among young people in Angelo's town.
Cathy - The local restaurateur and owner of Cathy's cupcakes. She sells tarts and cupcakes. Angelo really likes her pastries.
Gigi - Miss Perla's niece. She likes to ride a tricycle.
Damien Burst - A pretentious, snobbish and selfish artist. He is a photographer and designer. He feels that he is not appreciated at his fair value. Occasionally, Angelo's middle school hires him to take class photos. In another episode, he temporarily lodges with Angelo's family but ends up making himself unbearable.

Video game

A video game for Android phones and tablets named Angelo Rules: Crazy Day, originally scheduled for release in the 4th quarter of 2014, has been available since July 2015. Another game, named Angelo Skate Away, was released in late June 2016 and is available on the Android platform, before being also available in early July 2016 on iOS.

Episodes
Four seasons have been produced so far; the first season consisting of 78 7-minute segments and the second, third and fourth seasons having forty-six 11-minute segments and three 21-minute segments.

Season 1 (2010)
All Season 1 episodes were directed by Chloé Miller.

Season 2
All Season 2 episodes were directed by Chloé Miller and Franz Kirchner.

Season 3
All Season 3 episodes were directed by Max Maleo.

Season 4 (2018)

Season 5

On April 5, 2021, a fifth season of Angelo Rules was announced. A teaser trailer was uploaded to TeamTO's YouTube channel on September 6, 2022.

Angelo's Tips
Alongside the main series, there is also a companion series of 30 one-minute episodes made under the title Angelo's Tips. All shorts were directed by Franz Kirchner.

Broadcast
Angelo Rules airs on Cartoon Network in over 152 countries. In the United States, the series was acquired by Cartoon Network and premiered on 1 January 2010, and season two debuted on 2 June 2014. In Ireland, an Irish language dub of the show broadcasts on TG4's children's block Cúla4.

Reception
Angelo Rules was one of 24 nominees for the second International Emmy Kids Awards in 2013.

References

External links
 

2009 French television series debuts
France Télévisions children's television series
France Télévisions television comedy
French children's animated adventure television series
French children's animated comedy television series
French children's animated fantasy television series
2000s French animated television series
2010s French animated television series
French computer-animated television series
French television shows based on children's books
Animated television series about children
Fictional trios